A Collection of Great Dance Songs is a compilation album by English rock band Pink Floyd. It was released on 23 November 1981 in the United Kingdom by Harvest Records and in the United States by Columbia Records.

Content
The album contains alternative mixes of "Shine On You Crazy Diamond" (comprised parts 1, 2, 4 and 7) and "Another Brick in the Wall (Part 2)".

"Money" was entirely re-recorded, as Capitol Records refused to license the track to Columbia/CBS Records. David Gilmour re-recorded the track himself, playing most of the instruments, and co-produced the song with James Guthrie. Dick Parry reprised his saxophone parts on the track.

Title and packaging

The ironic title was a reference to the disco rhythms of "Another Brick in the Wall (Part 2)", as well as Nick Mason's joke that the band's U.S. label "probably thought they were a dance band". The album art featured a photograph of ballroom dancers anchored to the ground so they cannot move. The inner sleeve had pictures of dancers in either a white (UK) or black (US) background.

Release and reception

The album was certified Gold by the RIAA on 29 January 1982 and Platinum on 6 July 1989 and Double Platinum in August 2001. The album reached number 37 on the United Kingdom charts and number 31 in the United States. Columbia issued the remastered CD in 1997 in the US and most of the world save Europe. Then a 1997 remastered CD was re-released in 2000 on Capitol Records in the US and EMI for the rest of the world including Europe. The album was released once again in 2016 under the band's Pink Floyd Records imprint, distributed by Sony Music internationally and by Warner Music in Europe, and was released on LP as well as CD.

Reviewing in Christgau's Record Guide: The '80s (1990), Robert Christgau said of the album: "With the rerecorded 'Money' sporting a livelier bottom to protect them from truth-in-titling and felonious injury charges, this gathers up their tuneful moments, which have always been far between – so far between, in fact, that even the unconverted may miss the ersatz symphonic structures in which they're properly embedded." Rob Sheffield was less enthusiastic in The Rolling Stone Album Guide (2004), writing that both this compilation and the next, 1983's Works, are "pointless 'hits' collections from a band that disdained hits".

Track listing

Original LP

8-track cartridge
Program 1

Program 2

Program 3

Program 4

Personnel
Pink Floyd
Roger Waters – bass (except on "Money" and "Sheep"), lead vocals on "Sheep", "Shine On You Crazy Diamond", and "Another Brick in the Wall, Part II", backing vocals, rhythm guitar on "Sheep"
Richard Wright – keyboards and synthesizers (except on "Money"), backing vocals
David Gilmour – lead and rhythm guitars, lead vocals on "Wish You Were Here", "Another Brick in the Wall, Part II" and "Money", bass on "One of These Days", "Money" and "Sheep", keyboards on "Money", drums on "Money", backing vocals
Nick Mason – drums (except on "Money"), vocal phrase on "One of These Days"

Additional personnel
James Guthrie – remastering production
The Islington Green School – vocals on "Another Brick in the Wall, Part II"
Dick Parry – saxophone on "Money"
Doug Sax – mastering and remastering
TCP (pseudonym for Hipgnosis) – sleeve design and photos (Storm Thorgerson, Peter Christopherson, and Aubrey "Po" Powell)

Charts

Certifications

References

External links 
Album trivia and quotes

1981 greatest hits albums
Albums produced by Bob Ezrin
Albums produced by David Gilmour
Albums produced by Nick Mason
Albums produced by Richard Wright (musician)
Albums produced by Roger Waters
Albums with cover art by Hipgnosis
Albums with cover art by Storm Thorgerson
Pink Floyd compilation albums
Capitol Records compilation albums
Columbia Records compilation albums
EMI Records compilation albums
Harvest Records compilation albums
Albums recorded at Morgan Sound Studios